is a manga by Osamu Tezuka serialized in Big Comic and licensed by Digital Manga.

Characters

References

Further reading

External links
 
 Swallowing the Earth at TezukaOsamu.net
 

Action anime and manga
Mystery anime and manga
Science fiction anime and manga
Seinen manga
Osamu Tezuka manga
Shogakukan manga
Digital Manga Publishing titles
Gekiga by Osamu Tezuka